Bressolles is the name of several communes in France:

 Bressolles, Ain
 Bressolles, Allier